Marie Joseph Lucien Wilfred Fortin (October 18, 1912 – December 28, 1984) was a Canadian politician. He served in the Legislative Assembly of New Brunswick as member of the Progressive Conservative party from 1952 to 1960.

References

1912 births
1984 deaths
Progressive Conservative Party of New Brunswick MLAs